A 0-6-2+2-6-0, in the Whyte notation for the classification of steam locomotives by wheel arrangement.. The only examples were forms of the Meyer. articulated locomotive.

Other equivalent classifications are:
 UIC classification: (C1')(1'C)t (also known as German classification and Italian classification)
 French classification: 031+130
 Turkish classification: 34+34
 Swiss classification: 3/4+3/4 up to the early 1920s, later 6/8

It is best known for its use in the French du Bousquet locomotives by Gaston du Bousquet.

The wheel arrangement was used by the Ferrocarril de Antofagasta a Bolivia in Chile, and by the Chemin de Fer du Nord in France

References

62
66,0-6-2+2-6-0T